Elżbieta Kuncewicz (born 14 March 1973) is a Polish rower. She competed in the women's lightweight double sculls event at the 2000 Summer Olympics.

References

1973 births
Living people
Polish female rowers
Olympic rowers of Poland
Rowers at the 2000 Summer Olympics
People from Łomża
Sportspeople from Podlaskie Voivodeship